Belwania is a village in West Champaran district in the Indian state of Bihar.

Demographics
 India census, Belwania had a population of 2836 in 477 households. Males constitute 52.15% of the population and females 47.84%. Belwania has an average literacy rate of 37.97%, lower than the national average of 74%: male literacy is 66.48%, and female literacy is 33.51%. In Belwania, 20.59% of the population is under 6 years of age.

References

Villages in West Champaran district